H. Percy Benson was an American football player and coach. He played college football as a quarterback at the University of California, Berkeley from 1892 to 1894.  He served as the head football coach at the University of Oregon in Eugene, Oregon during 1895, compiling a record of 4–0. Benson also coached the Butte Athletic Club of Butte, Montana in 1897.

Head coaching record

College

References

Year of birth missing
Year of death missing
American football quarterbacks
California Golden Bears football players
Oregon Ducks football coaches